The pale-naped brushfinch (Atlapetes pallidinucha) is a species of bird in the family Passerellidae.

It is found in Colombia, Ecuador, Peru, and Venezuela. Its natural habitat is subtropical or tropical moist montane forest.

References

pale-naped brush finch
Birds of the Colombian Andes
Birds of the Ecuadorian Andes
pale-naped brush finch
Taxonomy articles created by Polbot